Robert Joseph Thalman (November 5, 1922 – January 31, 2012) was an American football and track coach.  He served as the head football coach at Hampden–Sydney College from 1956 to 1959 and at the Virginia Military Institute (VMI) from 1971 to 1984, compiling a career college football record of 80–103–4.  He led the VMI Keydets to Southern Conference championships in 1974 and 1977.  Thalman played football at the University of Richmond, from which he graduated in 1948.

Thalman was the line coach in football and head track coach at Norview High School in Norfolk, Virginia until he was hired, in 1953, to be an assistant football coach at head track coach at Hampden–Sydney.

Head coaching record

College football

References

External links
 

1922 births
2012 deaths
Georgia Tech Yellow Jackets football coaches
Hampden–Sydney Tigers athletic directors
Hampden–Sydney Tigers football coaches
North Carolina Tar Heels football coaches
Richmond Spiders football players
VMI Keydets football coaches
College track and field coaches in the United States
High school football coaches in Virginia
Sportspeople from Wheeling, West Virginia
Players of American football from West Virginia
Deaths from Alzheimer's disease